The Shadows Grow Longer is a 1961 Swiss-West German drama film directed by Ladislao Vajda. The film was selected as the Swiss entry for the Best Foreign Language Film at the 34th Academy Awards, but was not accepted as a nominee. The film was shot in Zurich and at the Spandau Studios in Berlin. The film's sets were designed by the art director Wilhelm Vorwerg.

Main cast
 Hansjörg Felmy as Max
 Luise Ullrich as Frau Diethelm
 Barbara Rütting as Christa Andres
 Fred Tanner as Dr. Borner
 Loni von Friedl as Erika Schöner
 Iris Erdmann as Hilde
 Renja Gill as Anni
 Bella Neri as Schoolgirl
 Margot Medicus as Barbara (as Margot Philipp)
 Carola Rasch as Bessie
 Elisabeth Roth as Schoolgirl Steffie
  as Helene

See also
 List of submissions to the 34th Academy Awards for Best Foreign Language Film
 List of Swiss submissions for the Academy Award for Best Foreign Language Film

References

External links
 

1961 films
1961 drama films
Swiss drama films
West German films
1960s German-language films
Films directed by Ladislao Vajda
Swiss black-and-white films
Films shot at Spandau Studios